The Meltheru and Keeltheru Mosques are located in Kottai (Fort), a famous locality in Salem, India which was ruled by Hyderali and Tipu sultans in earlier centuries. The two mosques are governed by a group of trustees.

Mosques in Tamil Nadu
Salem district